Dmitri Denisovich Kotov (born 22 November 2000) is a Russian football player. He plays for FC Dynamo Vladivostok.

Club career
He made his debut in the Russian Football National League for FC Krasnodar-2 on 4 October 2020 in a game against FC Nizhny Novgorod.

References

External links
 Profile by Russian Football National League
 

2000 births
Sportspeople from Tula, Russia
Living people
Russian footballers
Association football forwards
Russian First League players
Russian Second League players
FC Krasnodar-2 players